The Lake Lans or Lanser See is a lake for bathing near Lans located on the southern highlands above Innsbruck, Austria. The lake can be reached by Streetcar Line 6 from Innsbruck. The lake is popular due to its green environment. It is used for ice-skating during the winter. The lake belongs to the city area of Innsbruck.

Thanks to its fen water the Lanser See has generally excellent water quality, although it is affected in summer due to its recreational use.

References 

Lakes of Tyrol (state)
LLans